Allen Erasmus 'Naka' Drotské (born 15 March 1971) is a former South African rugby union player, who played for the Springboks between 1993 and 1999.

Playing career

Provincial
Drotské played as a flank for the  Schools team at the 1989 Craven Week tournament and gained selection for the South African Schools team. In 1992 he made his provincial debut for Free State, also playing as a flank and during the 1993 he converted to the playing position of hooker.

In 2001 Drotské signed with London Irish to play for the club until 2003 and the following year he started in the 2002 Powergen Cup Final at Twickenham, as London Irish defeated the Northampton Saints.

International
Drotské played his first test match for the Springboks on 13 November 1993 against Argentina in Buenos Aires, a game the 'Boks won 52–23. He was a member of the 1995 Rugby World Cup winning squad, playing in one match and was also a member of the 1999 Rugby World Cup squad. During the 1999 World Cup, he played in six matches for the Springboks.

Test history

Coaching career

He announced his retirement from coaching on 8 May 2015 to pursue other business interests.

Personal life
In November 2018, Drostké was shot during a robbery in Pretoria, and was left in a critical condition.

See also
List of South Africa national rugby union players – Springbok no. 601

References

External links
Springboks site 1999
scrum.com statistics
itsrugby.co.uk

1971 births
Living people
People from Setsoto Local Municipality
White South African people
South African rugby union coaches
South African rugby union players
South Africa international rugby union players
Bulls (rugby union) players
Lions (United Rugby Championship) players
Free State Cheetahs players
Rugby union hookers
Rugby union players from the Free State (province)